Synanon is a 1965 American drama film directed by Richard Quine and starring Chuck Connors, Stella Stevens, Alex Cord, Richard Conte, Eartha Kitt and Edmond O'Brien. It featured a screenplay by Ian Bernard and was filmed at Synanon in Santa Monica, California.

Plot
Hooked on heroin, Zankie Albo is admitted to Synanon House, a rehabilitation center. Chuck Dederich, a recovering alcoholic, is in charge.

Zankie is placed in the care of Joaney during his early, painful stages of drug withdrawal. She, too, is a rehabbing junkie, and any further mistake on her part could permanently cost her custody of her child.

An attraction develops between Zankie and Joaney, resulting in jealousy from another man interested in her, Ben, a parolee and "graduate" of the center. Ben reports them to the center's officials after catching Zankie and Joaney in a romantic tryst. A patient who manages to get high on cough medicine is persuaded by Zankie to share it, leading to a tragic end.

Zankie, while in a seedy motel room with Joaney, shoots up heroin, which unbeknownst to him is bad. As he experiences a reaction to the drug, Joaney watches in horror; seconds later, Zankie is dead from the overdose.

Cast

Reception
A. H. Weiler of The New York Times was positive: "Richard Quine, who produced and directed this new arrival ... has glaringly spotlighted residents of this West Coast haven for the dope and alcohol enslaved, with results that are arresting and informative. ... Mr. Quine and his troupe achieved authenticity and a documentary quality simply by filming their story at the actual Synanon House on the beach at Santa Monica, Calif."

References

External links

1965 films
1965 drama films
American black-and-white films
American drama films
Columbia Pictures films
1960s English-language films
Films about heroin addiction
Films directed by Richard Quine
Films scored by Neal Hefti
Films shot in Los Angeles County, California
1960s American films